Andrew Duncan (born ) is a former professional rugby league footballer who played in the 1990s. He played at representative level for Scotland, and at club level for Fortitude Valley Diehards, Eastern Suburbs Tigers, Warrington Wolves (Heritage № 962), and London Broncos.

International honours
Andrew Duncan won a cap for Scotland while at London Broncos 1997 1-cap (interchange/substitute).

References

External links
Statistics at wolvesplayers.thisiswarrington.co.uk

1972 births
Living people
London Broncos players
Place of birth missing (living people)
Scotland national rugby league team players
Warrington Wolves players
Fortitude Valley Diehards players
Eastern Suburbs Tigers players